Pontyrhyl railway station, also known as Pontrhyll railway station, served the village of Pont-y-rhyl, in the historical county of Glamorgan, Wales, from 1886 to 1953 on the Garw Valley Railway.

History 
The station was opened on 25 October 1886 by the Great Western Railway. It was first known as Pontyrhyll but it was changed in August 1887. It was also known as Pont-y-rhyll in the handbook of stations in 1899 but the hyphens were removed in 1904. The station closed on 9 February 1953. The track still exists and the station house is a private residence.

References

External links 

Disused railway stations in Bridgend County Borough
Former Great Western Railway stations
Railway stations in Great Britain opened in 1886
Railway stations in Great Britain closed in 1953
1886 establishments in Wales
1953 disestablishments in Wales